Grand Galaxy Park is a retail and entertainment space that contains a park, mall, school, and residential units.

See also

List of shopping malls in Indonesia

References

Shopping malls in Indonesia
Post-independence architecture of Indonesia